The 2011 Republican National Committee (RNC) chairmanship election was held on January 14, 2011, to determine the next chairman of the RNC, to serve a two-year term ending in 2013 and will lead the party through the 2012 general elections. After seven rounds of balloting, Reince Priebus was elected chairman over incumbent chair Michael Steele, Saul Anuzis, Ann Wagner and Maria Cino.

Priebus won re-election with near unanimity in the party's 2013 meeting in Charlotte, North Carolina.  He was likewise re-elected to a third term in 2015, setting him up to become the longest serving head of the party ever.

Candidates
Saul Anuzis, National Chairman for the Save American Jobs Project, former Michigan Republican Party Chairman
Maria Cino, Political Director of George Bush's 2000 Campaign
Reince Priebus, Chairman of the Republican Party of Wisconsin
Michael Steele, incumbent Committee Chairman, former Lieutenant Governor of Maryland
Ann Wagner, former United States Ambassador to Luxembourg, former Missouri Republican Party Chairman

Former candidates who withdrew before voting began
Gentry Collins, Former Political Director of the RNC, withdrew on January 2, 2010
Gary Emineth, Chairman of the North Dakota Republican Party

Timeline
 December 13, 2010 – Incumbent Chair Steele announces bid for re-election.
 January 3, 2011 – Candidate debate held by Americans for Tax Reform at the National Press Club
 January 14, 2011 – Election held by party voting members in Washington, D.C.

Debates
A debate among the candidates hosted by Americans for Tax Reform took place on January 3, 2011 at the National Press Club. Anuzis, Cino, Priebus, Steele, and Wagner participated in the debate.
Republican Committee Chair Debate, C-SPAN, January 3, 2011, full video

Polling
A poll by the National Journal, released on January 13, 2011, showed Priebus in the lead with 40 committed votes out of 168, Steele 17, Wagner 15, Anuzis 14, and Cino 12.

Results
With 168 voting members of the RNC, 85 votes were required to win the chairmanship.

 Candidate won majority of votes in the round
 Candidate secured a plurality of votes in the round
 Candidate withdrew

References

National Committee
Republican National Committee Chairmanship Election, 2011
Michael Steele
Republican Party (United States) leadership elections
Chairmanship election, 2011
Republican National Committee chairmanship election